Events in the year 2021 in Angola.

Incumbents
President: João Lourenço
Vice President: Bornito de Sousa

Events
Ongoing — COVID-19 pandemic in Angola

Deaths
8 May – Raul Danda, politician, MP (born 1957).

References

 
2020s in Angola
Years of the 21st century in Angola
Angola
Angola